Christopher John Scarre, FSA is an academic and writer in the fields of archaeology, pre-history and ancient history. He is Professor of Archaeology at the University of Durham and was head of its archaeology department 2010-2013.

Early life
Scarre studied at the University of Cambridge. He graduated with a Bachelor of Arts (BA) degree, that was later promoted to Master of Arts (MA Cantab) degree. He then undertook postgraduate study of landscape change and archaeological sites in western France, culminating in a Doctor of Philosophy (PhD) degree.

Academic career
Scarre was Deputy Director of the McDonald Institute for Archaeological Research at the University of Cambridge from its foundation in 1990 to 2005. In January 2006, Scarre was appointed Professor of Prehistory at the Department of Archaeology of the University of Durham. In 2006, he was Professeur Invité at the Collège de France in Paris.

He has directed and co-directed excavations at a number of prehistoric sites. These include sites in France, Portugal, and the Channel Islands. Beginning in 2008, he led excavations exploring the prehistoric monuments of Herm. This project was Arts and Humanities Research Council-funded and a final excavation was under taken in the summer of 2011.

He was editor of the Cambridge Archaeological Journal from 1991 to 2005. He is the current editor of the international academic journal Antiquity, having been appointed in January 2013.

In 2007, he was elected to the post of Trustee of the Council for British Archaeology.

Personal life
His brother, Geoffrey Scarre, is Professor of Philosophy at the University of Durham.

Honours
On 9 January 1986, Scarre was elected Fellow of the Society of Antiquaries of London (FSA).

Selected works 
 
 
 
 
 Mohen, Jean-Pierre, Scarre, Chris Les Tumulus de Bougon. 2002, Complexe mégalithique du Ve au IIIe millénaire. Paris: Errance.
 Scarre, Chris, Fagan, Brian M. Ancient Civilizations. 2002, New York: Prentice Hall.
 Les Monuments Mégalithiques de la Grande Bretagne et d'Irlande. 2005, Paris: Errance.

Editorial activity 
 Megalithic Quarrying: Sourcing, extracting and manipulating the stones. 2009, Oxford: Archaeopress.
 
 Laporte, Luc, Joussaume, Roger & Scarre, Chris Origin and Development of the Megalithic Monuments of Western Europe. 2006. Bougon: Musée des Tumulus de Bougon.
 
 Cherry, John, Scarre, Chris & Shennan, Stephen Explaining Social Change: studies in honour of Colin Renfrew. 2004. McDonald Institute Monographs. Cambridge: McDonald Institute for Archaeological Research.
 
 The Seventy Wonders of the Ancient World (1999).
 Editor-in-chief of the Cambridge Archaeological Journal (1990–2005).

References

External links
"Archaeologist Chris Scarre finds fascination in discovering the past by examining its material remains.", History Today

Living people
Academics of Durham University
Alumni of the University of Cambridge
English archaeologists
Academic journal editors
Fellows of the Society of Antiquaries of London
Academics of the University of Cambridge
Year of birth missing (living people)